Furcifer balteatus, also known as the two-banded chameleon or the  rainforest chameleon, is a species of chameleon that is endemic to Madagascar. It was described by André Marie Constant Duméril and Gabriel Bibron in 1851.

Distribution and habitat

Furcifer balteatus is endemic to southeast Madagascar. It has been found over an estimated area of  but has a "patchy distribution" and is believed by the International Union for Conservation of Nature to be decreasing in population. It is a rare species and most of the sightings were of single individuals. Some surveys have failed to locate any individuals and it is ranked as an Endangered species by the IUCN. The major threat to this species is degradation of its forest habitat. It is a CITES-listed species and export from Madagascar has been banned since 1994. Nevertheless, it is believed to be highly desirable to the pet trade and illegal exports are a threat.

Description
Though basically green, Furcifer balteatus is variable in colour and is well camouflaged in its arboreal surroundings. It often has darker green diagonal stripes with paler bands between and usually has a characteristic buff-coloured diagonal streak. It is commonly known as the two-banded chameleon or the rainforest chameleon.

Taxonomy
The species was initially described in Duméril & Duméril 1851: 32 by Duméril and Bibron. It was described as the Dicranosaura bifurca var. crassicornis by Gray in 1865, and then as Chamaeleon balteatus in 1865: 347 by the same person. It was next described by Angel in 1942 as Chamaeleo balteus. Werner in 1911: 27 later described it under Chamaeleon bifidus, and then it was described as Chamaeleo bifidus fifty-five years later in Mertens 1966. Brygoo and Domergue described it as Chamaeleo balteatus in 1969, and then Brygoo described it under the same name in 1971 and 1978. In 1986, it became known as the Furcifer balteatus. Klaver and Böhme described it as this in 1986, and it was later described under the same name by Glaw and Vences in 1994. Furcifer balteatus was most recently described by Necas in 1999 as Furcifer balteatus.

References

Furcifer
chameleon
chameleon
Endangered fauna of Africa
Reptiles described in 1851
Taxa named by André Marie Constant Duméril
Taxa named by Gabriel Bibron
Fauna of the Madagascar subhumid forests